Life's a Zoo is a Canadian stop motion sitcom created by Adam Shaheen and Andrew Horne. It is directed by Alexander Gorelick. A co-production of Cuppa Coffee Studios and Teletoon, "Life's a Zoo.tv" was named Best Animated Program or Series at the 24th Annual Gemini Awards. It premiered on September 1, 2008, on Teletoon's late night programming block, Teletoon at Night. It premiered on Smosh's Cartoon YouTube channel, Shut Up! Cartoons on June 23, 2013.

Premise
The show is a parody of the reality TV series Big Brother, with a similar plot.  The seven very different contestants share a mansion "Somewhere in Saskatchewan..." where they compete in challenges to avoid being  (the show's version of elimination), supervised by the show's host, Claude the vulture in the first season, and later Bobbie the seal in the second.  In the first season, despite being eliminated, characters always come back, as Life's a Zoo doesn't use continuity. However, starting in season two, characters are permanently eliminated.  Additionally, each episode features a specially edited music video from a different artist.  The show won Best Animated Series at the Canadian Gemini Awards in 2009.

Main characters
 Ray (Mike Rowland) - A spastic orangutan who often commits acts of random stupidity. Ray is the party-animal of the group; he acts completely on impulse and usually performs dangerous or reckless stunts.  He is shown to be loud-mouthed and has bloodshot eyes from smoking marijuana, evidenced by the fact that he owns a bong.  Ray claims that his parents went out partying a lot when he was a child, which made him very lonely. He loves watching cartoons and playing video games. Ray is also known to make outrageous bets, which he cannot pay off, although he becomes rich after betting on Jake to win in the finale. He was the fifth one eliminated in the second season. He used the money he won to rebuild the mansion after Jake blew it up, therefore feeling entitled to own it too.
 Jake Oswalt (Kurt Firla) - A Canadian pig who constantly attempts schemes, believing himself to be a genius when it comes to reality show strategy.  He joined Life's a Zoo by accidentally walking into the audition trailer thinking it was a sperm bank.  He still lives with his mother, although she won't admit to raising him.  Jake has been shown to be egotistical and devious, and is often delusional about his own grandeur. He constantly lies to the audience about his sexual encounters and often makes up stories to make himself look good.  Jake lusts after Minou, and usually spies on her when she is showering. He also believes that she lusts after him just as much, and that they will have sex before the season ends, despite her disgust with him. He was the first one to be eliminated in the first season. In the second season, because of Minou's early elimination he begins to lust after Bobbie instead. Jake made it to the finale in the second season as the runner-up, but won the house when Chi-Chi forfeited it. Unfortunately, he had rigged the house to explode when she won and couldn't prevent it from happening.  He now works as Ray's servant in the rebuilt mansion.
 Morreski (Stephen Kishewitsch) - An alcoholic Russian Brown bear with a thick accent who wears a fez. He is the oldest member of the cast at 62. Morreski is a heavy drinker, he is always seen near a bottle of vodka, and will burst into fits of rage when he is denied it. He is heard talking about his homeland many times over the series, and mentioning his wife, who is presumably very manly for a woman. Morreski is also very protective of his mother, as shown in two instances when he swears and beats up Dr. D for insulting her. Even though he is very laid back and drunk, Morreski is the wisest and strongest of the cast. He has had many jobs over the years, and thus has a wide skill-set. In the second season, he was the third one eliminated, although he made a special appearance in the next episode as a wedding officiant.
 Dr. D (Joseph Motiki) - A rapping gangster penguin who wears a cap, sunglasses and much bling and has a no-nonsense attitude. He usually gives his opinion without caring about the consequences. He has a strong taste for cigars as well as his rap music. Dr. D is also known to be violent, threatening Ray when he bets with him and doesn't get paid, and often brags about his life in the "hood." In the second season, it is revealed that he is actually a poser, his real name is Dewey Dewson, and he only pretended to be a gangster to further his rap career. He was the second one eliminated in the second season. After being found out he went back to being Dewson, but tends to slip into his Dr. D persona when angry.
 Rico (Francisco Trujillo) - A homosexual American crocodile with a Latino swish. He is a fashion designer, as well as a stereotype. Rico is the most passionate of the group, and is the "bitchy one" when Minou's not around. It is revealed in the episode "Truth or Consequences" that the producers actually asked him to play up his homosexual lifestyle, including his Latino accent, since they wanted him to be more camp and he has since grown used to and embraced as part of himself.  When Rico was young, his father tricked him into believing it was okay for him to come out, an action which resulted in his father throwing a tantrum and beating him.  His father is still disappointed in him, believing his homosexuality is a phase.  Rico once "experimented" with being married to a woman, however, it didn't work out.  He was the fourth one eliminated in both the first and second season.
 Minou (Bridget Ogundipe)- A Jamaican Black panther with a different hairstyle every episode (revealed in the episode "Self Helpless" to actually be from a collection of wigs).  Minou is greedy and snotty, believing everyone else is beneath her, but the men are attracted to her nonetheless. She suffers constant harassment from Jake, who spies on her while she showers. She is revealed to be bulimic, once commenting that it's a great way to keep her tummy flat, and that bulimia came from sex. Minou is extremely insecure about her appearance deep down; which comes out as anger. In the episode "Ray Against The Machine", it is revealed that Minou would have won the mansion before the original episode script was destroyed, despite the fact that she was eliminated in the episode "Live and Let Diet".  She was the first one eliminated in the second season; she jumped out of a plane without a parachute in the first episode of season two, thinking the plane was fake.  She showed up later in the episode in a body cast only to be shoved out the front door.  Minou appeared in the season finale, still in the body cast, and later escaped the mansion with the other characters.
 Chi-Chi (Stephanie Jung) - An overweight panda from China. She teaches the fifth grade.  Chi-Chi has an enormous appetite, and is extremely gluttonous, eating everything and anything.  She is goodhearted, but usually shunned by the others.  Since she was two years old, her mother, now deceased, made her play an erhu all the time, saying it was better for her than being out and making friends.  She was the second one eliminated in the first season, in the episode "It's Not Easy Being Chi", however she bought her way back in.  Chi-Chi has a promiscuous side to her, and by the end of the series she has slept with most of the male cast but not Jake or Rico.  In the second season, she made it all the way to the final episode before being drugged comatose and losing her memory.  Bobbie made her watch the entirety of the first season to refresh her memory while the other disqualified characters voted on whether she or Jake should win the mansion.  Chi-Chi won the house, but turned it down because she was ashamed and disgusted with what the show had made her into.  What happened to her after the destruction of the mansion is unknown, but it is suggested she went back to her home in China to get in touch with the "real her".
 Claude (Michael Lamport) - A vulture who was the host for season one.  He often makes witty comments on the plot before and after every commercial break, as well as refereeing all the challenges.  Claude is shown to be usually reading, or commenting how he wants to get a better gig. While enthusiastic in the first few episodes, he soon becomes despaired over the chaos the contestants cause. After Ray discovered the show was scripted, the contestants revolted and tied him up. It is most likely that he was tied up in the basement of the mansion for the entirety of the second season and was killed in the explosion.
 Bobbie (Stacey DePass)- The seal hostess of the second season, replacing Claude.  Despite her sweet demeanour, she is much tougher than Claude, and far more determined to find a winner for the show.  In the episode "Truth or Consequences" it is revealed that she is in her fifties, has had plastic surgery, has been married and divorced several times, and, though Dr. D doesn't get to reveal it, may also be a male-to-female transgender.  It is unknown if she escaped with the other characters or died in the explosion.

Episodes

Shut Up! Cartoons
The rights to the series were bought by Smosh to be aired on their Shut Up! Cartoons YouTube channel. Most of the show remains the same with the exception of the inclusion of Shut Up! Cartoons intros and outros and notably more censorship of profanity, drug references, and sexual content.

Planned spin-off
There were plans for a child-friendly spin-off called Pen Pals. The series would have feature Jake and Ray as the main characters. The project has been since been scrapped as references to it were removed from the official Cuppa Coffee Studios website.

References

External links
 

2000s Canadian adult animated television series
2000s Canadian satirical television series
2000s Canadian sitcoms
2008 Canadian television series debuts
2009 Canadian television series endings
Canadian adult animated comedy television series
Canadian animated sitcoms
English-language television shows
Teletoon original programming
Television series by Cuppa Coffee Studios
Animated television series about apes
Animated television series about bears
Animated television series about birds
Animated television series about penguins
Animated television series about pigs
Fictional panthers
Fictional pinnipeds
Reptiles in popular culture
Television series about pandas
Television shows set in Saskatchewan